Jeziory Dolne  is a village in the administrative district of Gmina Brody, within Żary County, Lubusz Voivodeship, in western Poland, close to the German border.

The village has a population of 165.

References

Jeziory Dolne